Jorge Artigas (born 16 December 1975 in Buenos Aires) is an Argentine retired footballer who played as a midfielder and manager.

Coaching career

Central Español
After retiring in August 2015, Artigas was appointed manager of his last club Central Español. He left the position at the end of 2017.

Defensor Sporting
On 1 April 2019, Artigas was presented as Ignacio Risso's assistant manager at Defensor Sporting. Artigas and Risso knew each other from Danubio, where they played together from 2004 to 2005. Artiga left together with Risso, who was fired in December 2019.

Cúcuta Deportivo
In February 2020, Artigas was appointed manager of Colombian club Cúcuta Deportivo. He left the club at the end of 2020 with only three victories in 12 games.

Deportivo Pereira
Ahead of the 2021 season, Artigas was appointed manager of Deportivo Pereira. He was fired on 21 February 2021 after zero victories in eight games.

Honours
Deportes Tolima
Categoría Primera A: 2003

Danubio
Uruguayan Primera División: 2004

Botafogo
Taça Guanabara: 2006
Campeonato Carioca: 2006

Al-Ahli
UAE President's Cup: 2007–08

References

External links
 
 

1975 births
Living people
Footballers from Buenos Aires
Argentine footballers
Argentina international footballers
C.A. Cerro players
Danubio F.C. players
Club Universitario de Deportes footballers
Deportes Tolima footballers
América de Cali footballers
Club Tijuana footballers
Dhofar Club players
Al Ahli Club (Dubai) players
Ayacucho FC footballers
Botafogo de Futebol e Regatas players
Avaí FC players
Central Español players
Categoría Primera A players
Uruguayan Primera División players
Expatriate footballers in Brazil
Expatriate footballers in Colombia
Expatriate footballers in Peru
Expatriate footballers in Uruguay
Expatriate footballers in the United Arab Emirates
Argentine expatriate footballers
Argentine expatriate sportspeople in Brazil
Argentine expatriate sportspeople in Colombia
Argentine expatriate sportspeople in Peru
Argentine expatriate sportspeople in Uruguay
Argentine expatriate sportspeople in the United Arab Emirates
Association football midfielders
Argentine football managers
Expatriate football managers in Uruguay
Expatriate football managers in Colombia
Categoría Primera A managers
Uruguayan Segunda División managers
Central Español managers
Cúcuta Deportivo managers
Deportivo Pereira managers